Hebius weixiensis, the Weixi keelback snake, is a species of snake of the family Colubridae. It is endemic to China and known from around Lijiang in Yunnan. The specific name weixiensis refers to its type locality, Weixi County.

Males measure  and females  in snout–vent length.

References 

weixiensis
Snakes of China
Endemic fauna of Yunnan
Taxa named by Che Jing
Reptiles described in 2021